The Pond-Weed House is a historic house at corner of the old Boston Post Road and Hollow Tree Ridge Road in the Noroton section of Darien, Connecticut. It has also been known as The House Under the Hill and Half-Way House.  Built ca. 1730, the house is a classic wood frame saltbox,  stories in height, five bays wide, with a central chimney.  It is considered to be the oldest building in Darien.

The house was listed on the National Register of Historic Places in 1978.

See also

List of the oldest buildings in Connecticut
History of Darien, Connecticut
National Register of Historic Places listings in Fairfield County, Connecticut

References

Buildings and structures in Darien, Connecticut
Houses on the National Register of Historic Places in Connecticut
Houses completed in 1700
Saltbox architecture in Connecticut
Houses in Fairfield County, Connecticut
National Register of Historic Places in Fairfield County, Connecticut
1700 establishments in Connecticut